The Bald Hills are a range of mountains, in Humboldt County, California.  The Bald Hills lie south of the Klamath and Trinity Rivers, between those rivers and Redwood Creek. The valleys at their feet and their lower slopes are covered by redwood forests but their summits are "bald", lacking woodland and instead are covered by meadows.

These hills gave their name to the Bald Hills War fought between the local Indian tribes among these hills and the forces of local settler militia, California State Militia and California Volunteers and United States Army from 1858 to 1864.

The hills are part of the Yurok Tribal lands. They are working with the local Redwood National and State Parks to restore the California condor to the area.

References

External links
 Redwood National Park: Bald Hills, All photographs ©Patrick Holleran, Shannon Digital Imaging, 1994-2012

Mountain ranges of Northern California
Mountain ranges of Humboldt County, California